Juan Sebastián Patiño (born 1 February 2001) is a Colombian footballer who plays as a left winger for Primera B de Chile side Universidad de Concepción.

Club career

Universidad de Concepción
Born and raised in Puerto Tejada, a town located on the outskirts of Cali, Patiño started to play football in his hometown, where he was spotted. He then got the opportunity to move to Chile at a young age, to fulfill his dream as a footballer.

Patiño joined Universidad Concepción in March 2019 at the age of 18. Two weeks after his arrival, he was promoted to the clubs reserve team and already one month later, he was on the bench for the first team squad in Copa Chile. However, he was not given the chance in the cup.

On 1 October 2020, Patiño got his official debut for Universidad Concepción in the Chilean Primera División against Palestino. Patiño ended the 2020 season with 14 appearances in the Primera División.

References

External links
 

Living people
2001 births
Association football wingers
Colombian footballers
Colombian expatriate footballers
Chilean Primera División players
Primera B de Chile players
Universidad de Concepción footballers
Expatriate footballers in Chile
Colombian expatriates in Chile
Sportspeople from Cauca Department
21st-century Colombian people